Papaya is a club on Zrće Beach on Pag Island in Croatia.
Papaya features several pools for pool parties as well as several bars and an open-air dance floor. The club was ranked 20th in DJ Magazine's annual "Top 100 Clubs" reader's poll in 2015.

Notable Artists
Armin Van Buuren, Loco Dice, Carl Cox, Calvin Harris and Swedish House Mafia.

References

External links 
 Papaya 
 Party Traveller

Nightclubs in Europe
Drink companies of Croatia
Pag (island)